The Europcar Cup was a professional team golf tournament played yearly in Biarritz, France, from 1985 to 1988.

The tournament was designated as an "Approved Special Event" on the European Tour schedule. A further event was planned in 1989 but was cancelled.

The event was contested by national teams of four players. Each golfer played four stroke-play rounds; the best three scores for each round being used for the team's score for that round.

The 1988 Europcar Cup took place 3-6 November. Sweden won the 1988 event by 6 strokes with a score of 810, 18 under par. The Swedish team was Magnus Persson, Johan Ryström, Mats Lanner and Jesper Parnevik.

The following teams competed: Austria, Belgium, Denmark, England, Finland, France, Greece, Ireland, Italy, Netherlands, Scotland, Spain, Sweden, Switzerland, Wales, West Germany.

Winners

References

Former European Tour events
Team golf tournaments
Defunct golf tournaments in France